1986 Dakar Rally also known as the 1986 Paris–Dakar Rally was the 8th running of the Dakar Rally event. René Metge and Dominique Lemoyne won the car class  for the second time, using a Porsche 959; Cyril Neveu won the motorcycle class on a Honda NXR750V, while Giacomo Vismara and Giulio Minelli used a Mercedes-Benz to win the truck class.

The event was overshadowed by the death of the event organiser, Thierry Sabine, and four others, including French singer Daniel Balavoine and helicopter pilot François-Xavier Bagnoud in a helicopter crash.

Final standings

Cars

Bikes

References

Dakar Rally
Paris
Paris
1986 in African sport